Marian Urdabayeva (born 3 April 1988) is a Kazakhstani judoka. She competed at the 2016 Summer Olympics in the women's 63 kg event, in which she was eliminated in the first round by Yang Junxia.

References

External links
 
 

1988 births
Living people
Kazakhstani female judoka
Olympic judoka of Kazakhstan
Judoka at the 2016 Summer Olympics
Asian Games medalists in judo
Judoka at the 2010 Asian Games
Judoka at the 2014 Asian Games
Medalists at the 2014 Asian Games
Asian Games bronze medalists for Kazakhstan
21st-century Kazakhstani women